Melide railway station is a railway station in the Swiss canton of Ticino and the municipality of Melide. The station is on the Swiss Federal Railways Gotthard railway, between Lugano and Chiasso. It is situated immediately to the west of the Melide causeway, which carries the railway, along with several roads, across Lake Lugano.

Services 
 the following services stop at Melide:

Gallery

References

External links 
 
 

Railway stations in Ticino
Swiss Federal Railways stations